Zuleydis Ortiz (born 31 January 1978) is a Cuban fencer. She competed in the women's individual and team épée events at the 2000 Summer Olympics.

References

External links
 

1978 births
Living people
Cuban female épée fencers
Olympic fencers of Cuba
Fencers at the 2000 Summer Olympics
Fencers at the 2011 Pan American Games
Pan American Games medalists in fencing
Pan American Games gold medalists for Cuba
Pan American Games silver medalists for Cuba
20th-century Cuban women
21st-century Cuban women